The Scottish Varsity, also known as The Royal Bank of Scotland Scottish Varsity Match due to sponsorship reasons, is an annual rugby union fixture between the University of St Andrews and the University of Edinburgh in Scotland. The universities are both founders of the Scottish Rugby Union and varsity fixtures have been held since the 1860s, laying claim to the title of the "world's oldest varsity match". 

The Scottish Varsity was resurrected in 2011 after a hiatus of over 50 years and was staged in London at the home of London Scottish RFC in order to build alumni relations. In 2015, the match returned to Scotland in Murrayfield Stadium and drew a crowd of over 10,000 spectators. In 2021, the match was played at University Park, the home of University of St Andrews RFC, due to Covid-19 pandemic crowd restrictions. The match is normally held in late September and has received coverage from Sky Sports, the BBC and IRB’s Total Rugby.

Men's Results

Varsity matches were initially held on St. Andrew's Day but have been moved earlier to late September, they have attracted notable attendees including her Royal Highness Princess Anne in 2012.

By total wins (Men's)

Women's Results 
In 2014, the inaugural Women's Varsity Match took place in the form of a 7-a-side match. It now continues to take place every year as a 15-a-side match.

By total wins (Women's)

See also
 University of St Andrews RFC
 Edinburgh University RFC
 Scottish Rugby Union
 The Varsity Match
 Varsity match

References

External links
University of St Andrews: Saints Rugby
University of Edinburgh: Edinburgh University RFC

University of St Andrews
University of Edinburgh
Student sport rivalries in the United Kingdom
Rugby union competitions in Scotland